Andrés Franzoia (born 21 October 1985 in San Pedro, Buenos Aires) is an Argentine football forward or second striker. He currently plays for Defensores Unidos.

Career
Franzoia is a product of the Boca Juniors youth system, he made his professional debut on 29 May 2005 in a 0-0 draw with Estudiantes de La Plata. In his second game for the club he scored a goal in a remarkable 7-1 win over San Lorenzo.

Franzoia had a number of opportunities to play in the first team with Chino Benítez and Ricardo Lavolpe as managers, but only played one game since Miguel Ángel Russo took over.

In 2007, he joined Huracán on a year long loan. He performed well in his new club, scoring 9 goals in 25 games to help the team to finish well clear of the relegation zone following their promotion to the Argentine Primera.

In 2008, Franzoia was bought from Boca by Rosario Central. After one and a half season in Central, he returned on a six-month loan to Huracán in January 2010. After finishing the loan, he returned to a recently relegated Rosario Central and agreed the termination of his contract earlier. Subsequently, he joined Arsenal de Sarandí.

On 12 July 2013, he became the new reinforcement of  Barcelona Sporting Club to face the second stage of their tournament and the Copa Sudamericana.  The striker will occupy the spot left open after Ariel Nahuelpan was transferred to Club Universidad Nacional A.C., more commonly known as Pumas de la UNAM.

Honours

References

External links
 Andrés Franzoia – Argentine Primera statistics at Fútbol XXI 
 

1985 births
Living people
Sportspeople from Buenos Aires Province
Argentine footballers
Association football forwards
Argentine Primera División players
Boca Juniors footballers
Club Atlético Huracán footballers
Rosario Central footballers
Arsenal de Sarandí footballers
Olimpo footballers
Unión de Santa Fe footballers
Barcelona S.C. footballers
Argentine expatriate footballers
Expatriate footballers in Ecuador
Argentine expatriate sportspeople in Ecuador